Pavol Pilár (born 27 July 1986 in Trstená) is a Slovak football.

The striker started his career with TJ Blatná Habovka and joined 2004 to Slovak Corgoň Liga club MFK Ružomberok.

References

1986 births
Living people
Slovak footballers
Association football forwards
MFK Ružomberok players
Slovak Super Liga players
People from Trstená
Sportspeople from the Žilina Region